Benoît Conort is a French poet and literary critic.  He also teaches at the  University of Paris X - Nanterre, under the department of modern literature.

He serves on the editorial board of the journal New Series where he published numerous poems and reviews.

Awards
 1988: Fénéon prize for For the island to come
 1988: Francis Jammes prize for For the island to come
 1992: Tristan Tzara prize for Beyond Circles
 1999: Mallarmé prize for Night Hand

Works

External links
 Site New Series

1956 births
Living people
French poets
French male poets
Prix Fénéon winners